Blue Corpse is the fifteenth album by Jandek, and his second for 1987. Primarily an all acoustic album with an unknown accompanist (identified only as "Eddie" during the instrumental break in "Down at the Ball Park"), it is considered by many to be one of the more accessible and cohesive albums in Jandek's oeuvre.

Album cover

The cover of Blue Corpse completes the series of images that began with Telegraph Melts (1986) and was continued with Modern Dances (1987). While the cover of Modern Dances shows the artist standing still and looking forward, the cover of Blue Corpse shows the artist in mid stride, producing a blurred image of the artist.

Album information

The tracks "I Passed by the Building" through "Variant" features an unknown man on lead vocals, and it is presumed that Jandek plays the guitar on these tracks. The tracks "Part II" through "Only Lover" appear to switch up this arrangement and feature Jandek on lead vocals and the unknown accompanist playing proficient blues guitar, with the except of "Harmonica" which features solo harmonica. "Quinn Boys" appears to be Jandek solo, while the closer "One Minute" features the unknown accompanist singing lead vocals and it is unknown who is playing drums.

Not unlike its follow up, 1988's You Walk Alone, the songs appear to be recorded in one session or in multiple sessions under the same conditions. This quality gives the album a cohesiveness that sets it apart from albums like Chair Beside a Window that appear to be compilations of multiple sessions under different conditions and with different players.

The album seems to center around the dissolution of a relationship which has led to many theories. Some have theorized that because from this point on it is not clear that 'Nancy' is ever featured on an album again, it may be referring to her departure. It is unknown if there is any merit to this theory because no definitive proof exists.

"Part II" appears to be the second half of "Your Other Man" but for some reason is sequenced right before that track. "House of the Rising Sun" is the first and only adaptation of a traditional song found in Jandek's discography, it features a unique arrangement and does not borrow from any other modern arrangement of the song. "Quinn Boys" gets a sequel on 1988's You Walk Alone which contains the same lyrics.

Track listing

Reviews 

This newer album contains more folk sounds and less of the dissonance Jandek is so well known for... Jandek's angst-ridden vocals... filled with trials and tribulations... -- Art Black Away From the Pulsebeat

External links 
 Seth Tisue's Blue Corpse review

Jandek albums
Corwood Industries albums
1987 albums